The   was a tanegashima in the form of a pistol. Bajō-zutsu were used by mounted samurai in feudal Japan.

References

Samurai weapons and equipment
Early firearms
Firearms of Japan
Single-shot pistols
Black-powder pistols